"We Cry" is the debut single of Irish band the Script. The single was released on 25 April 2008 and is said to be about people whom the band's frontman Danny O'Donoghue knew while growing up in Dublin. The song has received a large amount of publicity (such as appearing in 90210), airplay and interest with BBC Radio 1 heavily backing the band.

Inspiration
Vocalist Danny O'Donoghue has said that the song reflects the tough times that life has in store. On 4Music's 4Play he referred to the loss of his father five months after a bandmate lost his mother to a terrible illness and claimed that such events could be overcome if people stuck together. A remix by one of the members of the band Rogue Traders,
James Ash was released in 2009.

Music video
The music video opens with various screenshots of an urban area in New York City which appears to be heavily graffitied. There are also shots of the full band playing their musical instruments in a flat room. However, the video quickly centres around Danny as he begins to sing while walking about the city. There are a few shots of the whole band playing the song in the flat but the main part of the video in this area is when Mark sings his verse. Although the video was uploaded to the Script's YouTube channel on 27 February 2008, the song became available to download on 18 March 2008 on the Irish iTunes Store, the video is available to download from iTunes.

Track listing
 CD single / Digital single 
 "We Cry" – 3:43
 "Fall For Anything" – 4:34

 German CD single
 "We Cry" – 3:43
 "Fall For Anything" – 4:34
 "Live Like We're Dying" – 4:01
 "We Cry" (Music Video) – 3:43

 Digital EP
 "We Cry" – 3:43
 "Fall For Anything" – 4:34
 "We Cry" (Live Mix) – 4:16

 Digital Remix EP
 "We Cry" (Bimbo Jones Remix) – 5:24
 "We Cry" (Bimbo Jones Dub) – 7:10
 "We Cry" (Ashanti Boyz Club Mix) – 5:12
 "We Cry" (Ashanti Boyz Dub) – 5:13
 "We Cry" (Ashanti Boyz Radio Edit) – 3:11
 "We Cry" (Afrojanic Remix) – 3:51

Charts and certifications

Weekly charts

Year-end charts

Certifications

References

2008 debut singles
2008 songs
Anti-war songs
Phonogenic Records singles
Protest songs
RCA Records singles
Songs about cities
Songs about poverty
Songs about prostitutes
Songs written by Andrew Frampton (songwriter)
Songs written by Danny O'Donoghue
Songs written by Glen Power
Songs written by Mark Sheehan
Songs written by Steve Kipner